Escape from the Shadows is a 1959 Czech drama film directed by Jiří Sequens. It was entered into the 1st Moscow International Film Festival where it won a Golden Medal.

Cast
 František Smolík
 Lída Vendlová
 Stanislav Remunda
 Josef Bek
 Renata Olarova
 Milena Asmanová
 Jaroslava Adamová as Irena
 Bohus Smutný
 Ruzena Lysenková
 Oldrich Vykypel
 Josef Kemr

References

External links
 

1959 films
1959 drama films
1950s Czech-language films
Czechoslovak black-and-white films
Czechoslovak drama films
1950s Czech films